Araxxe is a French-based company that specialises in fraud related services. The two best known services are fraud detection and revenue assurance, typically offered to telecommunication companies. Araxxe is based in Lyon, France, and was founded in 2005.

Araxxe in 2015 were operational in over 150 countries, providing SMS, GSM and 3G fraud monitoring for some of the largest telecom networks globally.

History
The company began in 2004 by developing a billing errors detection service, which was launched as Aramis. The system was officially released in early 2005 by Araxxe SAS. The system was one of the first of its kind to really begin to thoroughly protect telecoms companies and users from telecoms billing errors.

In 2007, Araxxe joined a number of companies in the European Telecommunications Standards Institute (ETSI). The company's aim was to contribute and work at standardizing the quality of services provided to monitor services used for Service Assurance and Revenue Assurance.

The company was a major contributor to ETSI 102 845, a technical standard about billing verification developed for the European Commission as part of the 2009 ICT standardization work permet and participated to its update in 2019.

In 2008, Araxxe became the fourteenth company in France to be awarded the ISO27001:2005, by the International Organization for Standardization. After the companies expansion to Latin America, it was predicted that their service would be made operational by 5-7 clients by the end of 2010.

Black Swan Telecom Journal interviewed Araxxe multiple times (Xavier Lesage who founded the company in 2005, and other experts from the company) in the area of expertise for interconnect Fraud and Billing Verification:    following a number of billing developments made by Apple Inc. <. At the time, the United States market operated a flat rate billing process and many believed that in the future real-time charging would steadily become the norm. Due to the United States operating a fairly simplistic system up unto that point, Araxxe's CEO was asked to speak about the transition and the problems that the United States telecoms market could face. Araxxe in 2012 became an Associate Member of the GSM Association. During the same period, the company filed and is now holder of six telecom patents. 

By 2018, it was stated in an interview that Araxxe robots were influencing protection and monitoring systems for SMS, GSM and 3G telecoms in over 180 countries. During the same year the company received an award locally in Lyon, for its export work as an SME.

By 2019, Rocco Research elected Araxxe as a top provider for SIM box detection three years in a row.

The lawyer firm Cornet Vincent Ségurel was Araxxe advisor when the company raised funds for 6,2M€ back in November 2019.The investors are Crédit Mutuel Innovation and Société Générale. The article mentions that the company counts among its customers the largest mobile telecommunications operators on all continents, particularly in France, Germany, US, Canada, Russia, Philippines, Malaysia, Brazil, Mexico, Morocco and Egypt. 

In 2020, Araxxe was the winner of the first “PSPC-Régions” call for projects. PSPC-Régions is a support mechanism financed by the Investments for the Future Programme (Programme d’Investissements d'avenir) whose aim is to select structural research and development projects to promote competitiveness.

Services
Araxxe offers two main forms of verifications as a service.

Billing verification
The first is an End to End Billing Verification service, which is used as a form of monitoring and provides an international network of test robots. These are deployed and operated remotely by Araxxe. One example of this was based on roaming telecommunication traffic in South Africa, prior to the 2010 FIFA World Cup. Additional robots were deployed to check the billing of clients who were attending the competition, in order to minimise fraud.
The ISAE 3402 certification owned by Araxxe since 2017 allows its customers to rely on a third-party auditor report certifying their internal controls as part of legal audits.

Fraud detection
Interconnect Fraud Detection is the second service, which focuses on billing and fraud detection interconnection. Fraud types include simbox, ghost trunks, trunk arbitrage, CLI refilling, SMS arbitrage and also OTT Bypass.

Both services collectively protect telephone users again interceptions and fraud. They ensure that bills are charged correctly and that phone calls and messages sent between different networks remain untouched.

Telecoms fraud takes place due to the overall complexity between differing systems. This typically happens due to three different pressures, value-based pricing pressure, regulatory pressure or competitive pressure. The differing price structures for effectively the same service means that charging customers incorrectly and fraud could be commonplace if systems such as this weren't operational.

Due to the varying number of paths and the creation of new ones, fraud of this nature would be almost impossible to wipe out completely. With intelligent robots, it ensures that common processes are monitored, which in turn ensures fraud is minimised.

References

Service companies of France
Companies established in 2005